Head Full of Honey is a 2018 drama film directed by Til Schweiger. It is an American remake of the 2014 German film of the same name, which Schweiger also directed and co-wrote with Hilly Martinek.

Premise
A widowed grandfather who has Alzheimer's disease is taken on a road trip to Venice by his granddaughter.

Cast
 Nick Nolte as Amadeus
 Matt Dillon as Nick
 Emily Mortimer as Sarah
 Sophia Lane Nolte as Matilda
 Jacqueline Bisset as Vivian
 Eric Roberts as Dr. Holst
 Greta Scacchi as Abbess
 Jake Weber as Dr. Edwards
 Til Schweiger as The London Restaurant Waiter
 Claire Forlani as Head Mistress
 J.David Hinze as Priest
 Matteo A.Bof as Train Station Policeman
 Veronica Ferres as Woman In Orient Express
 Costa Ronin as Russian Oligarch In Restaurant

Production
An American remake of Til Schweiger's film Head Full of Honey was announced in March 2018, with Schweiger directing. Nick Nolte was cast in the leading role, which Michael Douglas was initially sought for. Matt Dillon and Emily Mortimer will star as his son and daughter-in-law respectively. Jacqueline Bisset joined the cast in April.

Filming had commenced by June in Germany. German state film funding spent $5.17 millionUS on this film; the funding was conditional on a release in Germany.

Reception

Box office 
During the first two weeks, the film grossed US$65,000 in German movie theatres. On the second weekend, only 155 persons watched Head Full of Honey. In contrast, the 2014 version was the most successful film in German movie theaters that year, with over seven million viewers over the entire run time.

Critical response
On review aggregator Rotten Tomatoes, Head Full of Honey has an approval rating of  based on  reviews.

References

External links

American drama films
Films shot in Germany
German drama films
American remakes of German films
2018 films
2010s English-language films
English-language German films
Films directed by Til Schweiger
Films scored by Martin Todsharow
Warner Bros. films
2010s American films
2010s German films
Films about Alzheimer's disease
Films about old age